Novellino may refer to:

 Il Novellino, an anonymous collection of short stories from 13th-century Tuscany
 Il Novellino, a collection of short stories by Masuccio Salernitano, a 15th-century Italian poet
 Augusto Novelli (1867–1927), Italian journalist, dramatist and writer, also known as Novellino
 Walter Novellino (born 1953), Italian football player and team manager